Haunter or Haunters may refer to:

 Haunter (Pokémon), a Pokémon species
 Haunter (film), a 2013 Canadian supernatural horror film
 Haunters, a 2010 South Korean science fiction action film

See also
 Ghost
 Haunt (disambiguation)
 Haunts (disambiguation)
 Haunted (disambiguation)
 The Haunting (disambiguation)